Complement factor H-related protein 2 is a protein that in humans is encoded by the CFHR2 gene.

References

External links

Further reading